St Philip's Church is an Anglican parish church in the diocese of Manchester, in the deanery and archdeaconry of Salford. The church was renamed in 2016 as Saint Philip's Chapel Street. It is located at Wilton Place, off Chapel Street in Salford, Greater Manchester, England.

The structure is registered as a Grade II* listed building on England's National Heritage List. It was a Commissioners' church, having received a subsidy from the Church Building Commission for its erection. Sir Robert Smirke, the church's architect, reused his design for St Mary's Church, Bryanston Square, London. The tower design was also employed at Wandsworth's St Anne's Church.

History

Smirke designed the church, which was completed between 1822 and 1824. The Church Building Commission provided a grant of £16,804 (equivalent to £1,510,000 in 2020) to help fund its construction. [A] J. Medland Taylor reorganised the inside of the church in 1895. The neighbouring church of St Stephen closed in 1962, and the parishes amalgamated to form St Philip with St Stephen.

Architecture

Exterior
The exterior of St Philip's is made of ashlar stone. It was built in the Greek Revival style. It features an undivided design, with a bell tower atop a semi-circular portico to the south. The church's body is divided into two levels. The upper floor windows are round-headed, while the lower-storey windows are straight-headed. On the north and south sides, are nine bays, and on the east and west sides, are three bays. The portico encloses a semi-circular porch, covering the central three bays on the south side. An Ionic colonnade with a balustraded parapet supports the portico. Plain pilasters separate the bell tower's round-arched apertures, which are alternately open and blind. Above this stage there are four clock faces, and the summit is capped by a dome. The clock was made by Whitehurst and Company of Derby. On the west front are three doorways; the central bay projects slightly forwards, and has a pedimented doorway.

Interior
The church's interior has galleries on three sides. The stained glass in the east window dates from the middle to late 19th Century; it was designed by R. B. Edmundson of Manchester. In the southeast chapel is a memorial to the First World War by Humphries, Jackson and Ambler, also of Manchester.

Organ
The two-manual organ was made by Renn and Boston in 1829. It was moved forwards from a position above the west door to the west gallery in 1873 by Alex Young and Company, who also carried out modifications. The organ was cleaned and restored in 1915 by Wadsworth and Company. In 1963, Noel Mander, performed further restoration of the organ including reversing some of 1873 modifications to maintain its historic character.

Present day

Services and other activities
St Philips provides worship service at 9:30am (Common Worship Communion service), 10:45am (contemporary service, including groups for children), and 6:30pm (contemporary service, including groups for young people) each Sunday.

The church is used for concerts, recitals and community activities. It is open to visitors between 10am and 4pm on Wednesdays.

It runs community activities, groups, and initiatives throughout the week, including Alpha for those exploring the Christian faith, Chapel Tots, Kids Life for primary school aged children, Bags of Hope, and student groups. 

Saint Philips works with St Philip's Church of England Primary School, located on Barrow Street.

See also

Grade II* listed buildings in Greater Manchester
Listed buildings in Salford, Greater Manchester
List of Commissioners' churches in Northeast and Northwest England

Notes
The size of the grant was greater than the actual construction cost (as shown in the infobox) because it also included contributions towards the cost of the site, legal fees, etc.

References

External links
Saint Philips Chapel Street Website

Church of England church buildings in Greater Manchester
Anglican Diocese of Manchester
19th-century Church of England church buildings
Commissioners' church buildings
Churches in Salford
Grade II* listed churches in Greater Manchester
Neoclassical church buildings in England